The Arroio Pelotas is a river of Rio Grande do Sul state in southern Brazil.

See also
List of rivers of Rio Grande do Sul

References
Brazilian Ministry of Transport

Pelotas